The Relief of Ireland Act 1640 (16 Cha. 1, c. 30) was an Act of Parliament passed by the Long Parliament. It was the first Act to be passed in relation to the Irish Rebellion of 1641.

The Act was "for a speedy contribution and loan" towards the relief of the King's subjects in Ireland. The Act empowered churchwardens and overseers to collect benevolences in their parishes that would be handed to Parliament. The Act was to remain in force until 1 June 1642.

Notes

Acts of the Parliament of England
1640 in law